State Route 68 (SR 68) is an  state highway that travels south-to-north, in the shape of the letter L, through portions of Washington County in the east-central part of the U.S. state of Georgia. It connects SR 57 southeast of Oconee with SR 24/SR 540 and SR 24 Spur west of Sandersville.

Route description
SR 68 begins at an intersection with SR 57 southeast of Oconee. It heads to the north-northeast to an intersection with SR 272. Then, it continues northeast until it enters Tenille. There, SR 68 has a short concurrency with SR 15. At the northern end of the concurrency, SR 68 turns to the northwest until it meets its northern terminus, an intersection with SR 24/SR 540 (Fall Line Freeway) just west of Sandersville. Here, the roadway continues as SR 24 Spur (Yank Brown Road).

Major intersections

See also

References

External links

 
 Georgia Roads (Routes 61 - 80)

068
Transportation in Washington County, Georgia